Algar Rurik Alexander von Heiroth (28 May 1908 – 1988) was a Finnish diplomat and a Bachelor of Philology. He was Finnish Ambassador to Mexico and to Cuba from 1964 to 1966 and to Israel from 1966 to 1975.

References 

Ambassadors of Finland to Mexico
Ambassadors of Finland to Cuba
Ambassadors of Finland to Israel
1908 births
1985 deaths